Sunderland City Council is the local authority of the City of Sunderland in Tyne and Wear, England. It is a metropolitan district council, one of five in Tyne and Wear and one of 36 in the metropolitan counties of England, and provides the majority of local government services in Sunderland.

Political composition 
Sunderland City Council has been controlled by the Labour Party from its formation in 1974 under the Local Government Act 1972. There are currently 42 Labour councillors, 17 Conservatives (one elected as UKIP), 14 Liberal Democrats, one independent (elected as UKIP) and one Reform UK councillor (elected as Conservative) on the council.

Elections 

Sunderland's Council area comprises 25 wards, each electing three councillors. Elections are held in thirds, in three years out of every four. Between 1974 and 1986, elections were held in every fourth year to Tyne and Wear County Council, until the County Council was abolished. In 1982 and 2004, all seats on Sunderland Council were up for election following boundary changes.

At the first round of elections in 1973, 78 councillors were elected from 26 wards, and the make-up of the Council was: 56 Labour councillors, 21 Conservatives, and one Independent.

At the 1982 local elections following boundary changes, 75 councillors were elected from 25 wards, and the composition of the Council was: 49 Labour, 15 Conservatives, eight SDP-Liberal Alliance, and three Independent Labour councillors

At the 2004 local elections following boundary changes, 75 councillors were elected from 25 wards, and the composition of the Council was: 61 Labour councillors, 12 Conservatives and two Liberal Democrats.

In the May 2016 local elections, the Labour Party gained two seats, the Conservatives held two seats, and the Liberal Democrats won one seat. This made the composition of the Council for 2016/17: 67 Labour councillors, six Conservatives, one Liberal Democrat and one Independent. Following by-elections in January 2017 and February 2018, the Liberal Democrats gained two further seats from the Labour Party.

In the May 2018 local elections, the Labour Party gained a seat from an Independent councillor in Copt Hill, but lost three seats to the Liberal Democrats, and two to the Conservatives.

In the May 2019 local elections, the Labour Party lost ten seats: four to the Conservatives, three to UKIP, two to the Liberal Democrats, and one to the Green Party. Neither UKIP nor the Green Party had previously been represented on the City Council.

The 2020 local elections were scheduled for 7 May 2020, but were postponed due to the coronavirus pandemic, and held on 6 May 2021.

Council wards 

The Sunderland City Council area is coterminous with the boundaries of the city's three parliamentary constituencies – Sunderland Central, Houghton and Sunderland South and Washington and Sunderland West – and the 25 Council wards are distributed between them.

The following Sunderland Council wards fall within the Sunderland Central constituency: Barnes, Fulwell, Hendon, Millfield, Pallion, Ryhope, St Michael's (covering the areas of Ashbrooke and Hill View), St Peter's (covering the areas of Roker and Monkwearmouth) and Southwick.

Houghton and Sunderland South constituency comprises the wards of Copt Hill, Doxford, Hetton, Houghton, St Chad's (covering the areas of Herrington and Farringdon), Sandhill (covering the areas of Thorney Close, Grindon and Springwell), Shiney Row, and Silksworth.

Washington and Sunderland West constituency comprises the wards of Castle (covering the areas of Castletown and Town End Farm), Redhill (covering Redhouse and Witherwack), St Anne's (covering South Hylton and Pennywell), Washington Central, Washington East, Washington North, Washington South and Washington West.

References 

Metropolitan district councils of England
Local authorities in Tyne and Wear
Leader and cabinet executives
Local education authorities in England
Billing authorities in England
Council